The Louisiana Army National Guard (French: Garde nationale de Louisiane) is a component of the Louisiana National Guard, and the state's reserve force within the United States Army. The Constitution of the United States specifically charges the National Guard with dual federal and state missions. When not federalized, the National Guard is the only United States military force empowered to function in a state status. Those functions range from limited actions during non-emergency situations to full scale law enforcement of martial law when local law enforcement officials can no longer maintain civil control. The Louisiana Army National Guard may be called into federal service in response to a call by the President or U.S. Congress.

Currently, there are approximately 11,500 soldiers serving in the Louisiana Army National Guard, organized into 74 units in 44 parishes (56 armory locations) across the state. When called, units from the Louisiana State Guard may assist the Louisiana Army National Guard.

History

The Louisiana Army National Guard was originally formed in the "18th Century when a militia was formed from among the civilian inhabitants of Colonial Louisiana to assist Royal French and Spanish troops in protecting the colony and preserving the peace" The Militia Act of 1903 organized the various state militias into the present National Guard system.

Several units of the Louisiana Army National Guard were activated in support of Operation Desert Shield/Desert Storm in 1990-1991. These included the 159th Mobile Army Surgical Hospital, which operated the only active hospital in southern Iraq in support of the 3d Armor Division during the ground war; the 812th Medical Detachment (Air Ambulance), which flew multiple Medevac missions during the ground war; the 3673rd Maintenance Company, which included members awarded the Bronze Star for their rescue actions during the Scud attacks in Dharan; and the 39th Military Police company, which assisted in managing the large number of POWs captured.

The 2003 invasion of Iraq saw the call up of several units including the 204th ATSG and the 1083rd, 1084th, 1086th, and 1087th transportation companies which upon entering the theater of operation fell under the command of V Corps during 2003-04. During OIF III (Operation Iraqi Freedom 3) the 256th Infantry Brigade served a combat tour during 2004-2005 and 2021 in Iraq/ Syria.  Units of the 225th Engineer Brigade have been mobilized for duty in both Iraq and Afghanistan. Additionally, aviation components such as the 1/244th Aviation Helicopter Battalion, 204th Theater Air Operations Group and the 812th Med Company have served in an active capacity for OIF multiple times at one year intervals. 165TH CSS BN Mobilized in 2008.  773RD MP BN has mobilized as separate companies. 159TH Air Guard SQDN has been mobilized. 256TH IBCT mobilized for a second tour to Iraq on 5 January 2010. The 415th Military Intelligence Battalion mobilized for a second tour to Afghanistan on 29 Nov 2010.

After Hurricane Katrina the LA ARNG organized Joint Task Force Gator to assist in relief efforts.

Training
Louisiana Army National Guard units are trained and equipped as part of the United States Army. The same ranks and insignia are used and National Guardsmen are eligible to receive all United States military awards. The Louisiana Army National Guard also bestows a number of state awards for local services rendered in or to the state of Louisiana.

Service
For much of the final decades of the twentieth century, National Guard personnel typically served "one weekend a month, two weeks a year", with a small portion of each unit working for the National Guard in a full-time capacity. New forces formation plans of the U.S. Army were announced in early 2007 modifying the recent (2001–2006) National Guard active duty callup pace. The new plan will nominally anticipate that each National Guard unit (or National Guardsman) will serve one year of active duty for every five years of service. Secretary of Defense Robert M. Gates imposed "a one-year limit to the length of Federal deployments for National Guard Soldiers." Call ups by Louisiana authorities for state emergencies are not included in this policy.

Units and formations
Joint Force Headquarters Louisiana (JFHQ-LA)
256th Infantry Brigade Combat Team
141st Field Artillery Regiment
2d Battalion, 156th Infantry Regiment
3d Battalion, 156th Infantry Regiment
2d Squadron, 108th Cavalry Regiment
769th Engineer Battalion
199th Brigade Support Battalion
Special Troops Battalion
225th Engineer Brigade
205th Engineer Battalion
527th Engineer Battalion
528th Engineer Battalion
61st Troop Command
139th Regional Support Group
Company B, 136th Expeditionary Signal Company
156th Infantry Band "Louisiana's Own"
415th Military Intelligence Battalion
165th Combat Sustainment Support Battalion
756th Medical Company
773rd Military Police Battalion - Camp Beauregard, Pineville, Louisiana. The 773d gets its numerical designation from the World War Two 773rd Tank Destroyer Battalion of the same name. 
 199th Regiment (Regional Training Institute)
1st Battalion (Non-Commissioned Officer Academy)
2nd Battalion (Modular Training)
 State Aviation Command
204th Aviation Group
 1st Battalion (Assault), 244th Aviation Regiment
 2nd Battalion, 244th Aviation Regiment
 Detachment 38, Operational Support Airlift

Facilities
Camp Beauregard - Pineville
Army Aviation Support Facility #2 at Esler Airfield - Pineville
Camp Minden, site of the deactivated Louisiana Army Ammunition Plant; the National Guard headquarters is at Bolin Hall, named for the late Judge James E. Bolin. - Minden
Camp Cook - Ball
Camp Villere - Slidell
Army Aviation Support Facility #1 at Hammond Northshore Regional Airport - Hammond
Gillis W. Long Center - Carville
Jackson Barracks - New Orleans

Historic units
  156th Infantry Regiment
  199th Infantry Regiment
  108th Cavalry Regiment
  141st Field Artillery Regiment
 159th Mobile Army Surgical Hospital (inactivated)
Troop E, 256th Cavalry

State Partnership Program 
Louisiana has two countries in the SPP (State Partnership Program).  Belize joined the SPP with Louisiana National Guard in 1996 and Haiti in 2011.  Both of these nations fall under the area of operations of SOUTHCOM.

See also
Louisiana State Guard

Notes

References
Louisiana National Guard, accessed 2004-04-14
GlobalSecurity.org Louisiana Army National Guard, accessed 2007-04-14
Unit Designations in the Army Modular Force, accessed 2006-11-26

External links

Bibliography of Louisiana Army National Guard History compiled by the United States Army Center of Military History

United States Army National Guard by state
Military in Louisiana